Pierre Douville (August 7, 1745 – July 17, 1794) was a French-Canadian naval captain and lieutenant who served in the American Revolution and French Revolution. Born on present day Prince Edward Island, Douville survived the 1758 Acadian deportation to France. He joined the French Navy and lived in Rhode Island during the American Revolution. During the American Revolution, he served as a French military intelligence officer who provided General George Washington with British ship and troop movements. Douville also took part in a smuggling mission in 1775, when he brought weapons and gunpowder from the French West Indies to the United States. Douville was one of the original members of the Society of the Cincinnati. Douville died in 1794 fighting for the French during the Glorious First of June.

Early life (1745–1758) 
Pierre Douville was born on August 7, 1745, in the town of Havre-Saint-Pierre, otherwise known as St. Peter's, on the island of St. John, which is present day Prince Edward Island. He was the youngest son and the tenth child of François Douville and Mary Roger. François Douville was the first inhabitant of Havre-Saint-Pierre and came to the island in 1719. Originally from Normandy, France, François and Charles Carpentier were shipwrecked on the island in 1719, "farther to the east [from where Havre-Saint-Pierre would be settled], at Naufrage." In a 1752 census, François Douville was one of the wealthiest inhabitants on the island, who made his living as a "fisherman, navigator, and ploughman or farmer."

Deportation and life in exile (1758–1763) 
In 1758, Pierre's family was forced to leave Havre-Saint-Pierre in what is known as the "Grand Dérangement", or the Expulsion of the Acadians. During the French and Indian War, the siege of Louisbourg Fortress in 1758 resulted in the British expelling the French-Canadians from St. John. The British put Havre-Saint-Pierre's inhabitants on a ship to St. Malo and destroyed the town.

The ship Pierre and his family were on landed at St. Malo in January 1759 after three months at sea. Within a few months of arriving at St. Malo, Pierre lost three sisters and one brother from disease.

Return to Canada (1763) 
Until 1763, Douville and his family lived in Saint-Servan. By 1763, the French and Indian War had ended. Even though France ceded its former colonies in North America, the British returned "the island of archipelago of St. Pierre and Miquelon" to the French. Douville and his family left Saint-Servan for France's last North American colony in June 1763 on the Marie Charlotte.

When the Douville family arrived at Miquelon they were granted land on the Ile-aux-Chiens, or the "Island of the Dogs," which was located in the harbor of Saint-Pierre. At an unknown date, the family moved to Saint Pierre and Miquelon.

Life at sea (1763–1775) 
In 1764 Douville left his family for a life at sea. His first job was aboard the fluyt The Nanny. The ship was contracted by the French crown to transport "displaced Acadians from Europe to Cayenne in French Guiana."

In 1765, at the age of twenty, Douville was promoted to second lieutenant aboard the ship Two Friends. The Two Friends transported 45 Acadians to France from Saint-Pierre and Miquelon in 1765. The 45 Acadians were forced to leave the French colony due to the colony's overpopulation.

Between 1765 and 1770, Douville worked on merchant ships that traded goods between Saint-Pierre and Miquelon and New England. Around 1770, Douville moved first to Pawtucket, and then to Providence, Rhode Island. He became "a shipmaster working for wealthy merchant houses" up until the American Revolution. Douville's knowledge of the New England coast would make him an important asset in the war.

American Revolution (1775–1783)

1775 "Arms Smuggling Scheme" 
In November 1775, Douville was involved in a mission with Nicholas Brown and Jonathan Clark Jr. In a collection of letters from the Naval Documents of the American Revolution, Volume 1, Pierre was referenced in a letter sent from Nicholas Cooke, the Governor of Rhode Island, to General George Washington, on September 9, 1776. The purpose of the operation was to import gunpowder into the United States from either France or the French West Indies. Referred to as "Mr. Du Ville", Cooke informed Washington that Douville "is esteemed a Person every Way well qualified, and to be depended upon, for the Execution of the Plan he proposes." Douville's plan, Cooke explained, was to voyage to Bayonne, France, "where he is well acquainted, and there take in a load of [gun]powder" onto his ship. The plan would work, Cooke explained, because the ship "can be effected in Three Days," which would not be enough time for British "intelligence of the Vessel cannot be sent to England timely enough for any measures to be taken to intercept [the ship] upon her Return." In another letter to Washington, from September 14, 1775, Cooke stated that the Colony of Connecticut was meeting that day to discuss Douville's "Voyage to Bayonne". He recommended that the operation happen now "and return upon this Coast in the Winter," because "the Enemy's Ships are unable to cruise" at that point. Washington approved of the voyage in a response letter to Cooke on September 18.

On November 15, 1775, Nicholas Brown sent a letter to Charles Jovett, a shipowner and acquaintance of Douville's. The letter requested Jovett should take a "load of good merchtb codfish delivered [to Providence, Rhode Island] between this and the first of March... But above all that Most Wanting is Cannon and Pistle Powder." The codfish would hide the gunpowder that Douville planned to smuggle in from France. Brown sent a letter to Douville and Jonathan Clark on November 15, 1775, confirming the plan. The plan was for Jovett to send Douville and Clark a ship that will either take them to the French West Indies or France for gunpowder and other weapons. Jovett was under orders from Brown to "Make full Insurance, upon what interest [Brown] may have onboard his Vessel Agst all resques, in eigther passage from St. Peters here or, from France here." The ship "Must be Deld in this Colony before the first day of April next at furthest" because the Continental Congress would pay for the gunpowder "at half a [Dollar per pound]" if the ship arrived in the United States by that date.

Unfortunately, Douville and Clark's efforts were for nothing. A letter from Major General Israel Putnam to George Washington on May 21, 1776, revealed that a French ship, called L'Amiable Marie, arrived in Long Island on May 20 with "12 Tonns powder-500 Small Arms and dry Goods" as its cargo. However, an "English Captn with a Boats Crew came on shore for Assistance to land his Goods, soon after the French Capt who was on Board-saw a small Sloop to Leward beating up to him, 'tis supposed he thot them friends" and the 'French Capt' "immediately weigh'd anchor." The 'French Capt' was Douville. Realizing that the boat was British and not an American ally, Douville attempted to make it to the Jersey Highlands, hoping he could "land his goods up one of the short rivers in proximity to" where American forces were located. However, the British ship Asia captured the L'Amiable Marie on May 20, 1776. The capture of the L'Amiable Marie was mentioned in a letter sent to George Washington from Commodore Esek Hopkins on September 2, 1776. Based on the information from ContinentalNavy.com, Douville's participation in the "Arms Smuggling Scheme" of 1775 resulted in the British burning down his family's home in Saint-Pierre and Miquelon.

Lieutenant (1776–1782) 

From 1776 to 1778, Douville served on the Continental Navy ship The Alfred as third lieutenant but was promoted to second lieutenant in 1777. In March 1778, The Alfred was captured by British forces near Barbados. Douville would have been sent to Forton Prison in England, but he was exchanged for a British officer "held by the French in the West Indies" in 1778. Gaining his freedom, Douville was able to be back in Rhode Island in time for his wedding to Cynthia Aborn.

July to August 1778 saw Douville serving on the Languedoc, the "flagship of the French fleet at Rhode Island." The ship was under the command of Vice Admiral Charles Hector Comte d'Estaing. It has been suggested by some sources that Douville was ordered to be stationed on the Languedoc "at the 'particular request' of General George Washington due to [Douville's] extensive knowledge of the New England Coast."

In 1780, Douville served as a "lieutenant in the Continental navy on the Queen of France and was captured when the ship was sunk during the fall of Charleston" in May. Fortunately for Douville, he was released at the insistence of Captain La Touch of the French Frigate Hermione. He and several other Continental Navy officers were released in mid-July.

From August 16, 1780, to November 30, 1782, Douville served on Le Duc de Bourgogne which was supplied with eighty guns, Le Neptune had seventy-four guns, and Le Triomphant had eighty guns.

When the War ended in 1783, Douville returned to Rhode Island to be with his family.

Career after the American Revolution (1784–1792) 
On October 5, 1784, Douville became a member of the Society of the Cincinnati, an award given to those "who had distinguished themselves" during the American Revolution.

In 1784, Douville resumed working in maritime trading. His work had him make numerous trips to the West Indies on the sloop Cynthia and the schooner Cynthia, both named after his wife.

In 1787, Douville brought Cynthia and their son Peter to St. Pierre and Miquelon to live while Douville continued his work in the West Indies. By 1789, the family had returned to Rhode Island.

In December 1792, Douville traveled to France, and served in the French navy from 1792 to 1794.

French Revolution (January 1793 – 1794) 
Douville enlisted in the Navy of the French Republic in January 1793, with a desire to "be useful to his country." He was assigned as lieutenant to the ship Achilles, and its mission was to protect the coastline of the Loire River and Brittany.

On February 25, 1794, Douville became the captain of l'Impeteux. Douville's ship was part of Admiral Louis-Thomas Villaret de Joyeuse's squadron. Villaret's squadron was tasked with protecting a convoy that was transporting grain from the United States to France. France, in 1794, suffered from famine due to the French Revolution and the British naval blockade surrounding France. The British fleet, led by Admiral Earl Howe, was tasked with destroying the convoy and the French squadron.

Glorious First of June and death (1794) 
The French and British fleets engaged in battle on May 28 until June 1, 1794. On June 1, Douville and the rest of the French navy faced off against Admiral Earl Howe"in which [Douville] dismasted the British ship of the line, Marlborough, of seventy-four guns." However, Douville gained eighteen wounds from the battle, and he and his ship were captured by the British.

Douville died on July 17, 1794, in Forton Prison, located in Gosport, England. He was buried in Portsmouth, England, "with the honors of war."

Personal life 

Douville married Cynthia Aborn on July 26, 1778, in Providence, Rhode Island, a week after Cynthia turned eighteen years old.

They had five children; Pierre in 1781, Cynthia in 1783, Lowrey Charles in 1786, Samuel Joseph in 1788, and Mary in 1789.

When Douville died, Cynthia Aborn received a pension from the French Government until her death in October 1806.

In popular culture 
One of Douville's descendants was the actor Charles Douville Coburn, an American film actor known for his role in Gentlemen Prefer Blondes.

Brown University has a painting of Douville. The painter is unknown, but it was completed in France before Douville's death. It was given to Brown University in 1887 by Douville's granddaughters, Miss Cynthia Douville and Mrs. Sarah A. Tinkham.

See also
Intelligence in the American Revolutionary War 
Intelligence operations in the American Revolutionary War
Society of the Cincinnati
:Category: French Canadians in the American Revolution 
French Revolution 
Deportation of the Prince Edward Island Acadians by Earle Lockerby 
L'Odysée d'un Acadian dans les Marines Americains et Française by Raymond Douville

References

Bibliography

English language
 Cynthia Aborn, 1760–1806. Ancestry.com. Accessed 29 November 2016. http://person.ancestrylibrary.com/tree/12279678/person/-297465842/story. 
 Pierre Douville, 1745–1794. Ancestry.com. Accessed 29 November 2016. http://person.ancestrylibrary.com/tree/12279678/person/-297465841/story. 
 Brown, Nicholas. Nicholas Brown to Pierre Douville and Jonathan Clark, 15 November 1775. In Naval Documents of the American Revolution, Volume 2, edited by American Naval Records Society, 1032. New York: American Naval Records Society, 2012. http://ibiblio.org/anrs/docs/E/E3/ndar_v02p08.pdf. 
 Cook, Nicholas. Nicholas Cook to George Washington, 9 September 1775. In Naval Documents of the American Revolution, Volume 2, edited by American Naval Records Society, 57–58. New York: American Naval Records Society, 2012. http://ibiblio.org/anrs/docs/E/E3/ndar_v02p01.pdf. 
 Cook, Nicholas. Nicholas Cook to George Washington, 14 September 1775. In Naval Documents of the American Revolution, Volume 2, edited by American Naval Records Society, 96–97. New York: American Naval Records Society, 2012. http://ibiblio.org/anrs/docs/E/E3/ndar_v02p01.pdf. 
 Emlen, Robert. "Pierre Douville Portrait Collection." Brown University Office of the Curator. Accessed October 29, 2016. http://library.brown.edu/cds/portraits/display.php?idno=262.
 Gardiner, Asa Bird. The Order of the Cincinnati in France. The Rhode Island State Society of Cincinnati, 1905, xiii.
 Hamilton, William Baillie. Place Names of Atlantic Canada. Toronto, Canada: University of Toronto Press. 1996. 477.
 Heath, William. To George Washington from William Heath, 21 June 1780. In Founders Online, National Archives. October 5, 2016.
 Hopkins, Esek. To George Washington from Commodore Esek Hopkins, 2 September 1776. In Founders Online, National Archives. Original source: The Papers of George Washington, Revolutionary War Series, Volume 6, 13 August 1776–20 October 1776, edited by Philander D. Chase and Frank E. Grizzard Jr., 201–202. Charlottesville: University Press of Virginia, 1994.
 Morris, Robert, and John Catanzariti. The Papers of Robert Morris, 1781–1784. Pittsburgh: University of Pittsburgh Press, 1984. https://books.google.com/books?id=AqyUvZlLIoEC&dq=pierre+douville+1794&source=gbs_navlinks_s.
 "Pierre Douville, Lieutenant." Continental Navy. 5 September 2016. http://continentalnavy.com/archives/2016/pierre-douville-lieutenant/.
 Putnam, Israel. Major General Israel Putnam to George Washington, 21 May 1776. In Naval Documents of the American Revolution, Volume 2, edited by American Naval Records Society, 187–188. New York: American Naval Records Society, 2012. http://ibiblio.org/anrs/docs/E/E3/ndar_v05p02.pdf. 
 Washington, George. George Washington to Nicholas Cook,18 September 1775. In Naval Documents of the American Revolution, Volume 2, edited by American Naval Records Society, 132. New York: American Naval Records Society, 2012. http://ibiblio.org/anrs/docs/E/E3/ndar_v02p02.pdf.

French language
 Arsenault, Georges. "Pierre Douville: Un Illustre Fils de L'Île Saint-Jean." Museeacadian.org. last modified 2008. http://museeacadien.org/lapetitesouvenance/?tag=1745
 Arsenault, Georges. "Honouring the Memory of François Douville: Havre-Saint-Pierre, or St. Peter's Harbour, is an Historical Site of Great Significance." The Guardian (Charlottetown. 1955) (0832-2708).
 Étienne Taillemite, Dictionnaire des marins français, Tallandier, 2002, p. 143
 Gérard Scavennec, Pierre Douville, Chronique d'histoire maritime, 2002, n°46, p. 34–62
 Gérard Scavennec, Pierre Douville, Racines et Rameaux Français d'Acadie, 1994, n°11, p 2-8 http://www.rrfa.fr/bull/11.pdf
 Raymond Douville, L'Odyssée d'un Acadien dans les marines américaine et française, Cahiers des Dix, 18, 1953

1745 births
1794 deaths
Continental Navy officers
French Canadians in the American Revolution
French Navy officers
Acadian people
American spies during the American Revolution